Baba Aaya Singh Riarki College is a college in the village of Tughalwala, Gurdaspur, Punjab, India. This college was a dream of Baba Aaya Singh.

Founding
Babaji did get the land donated by Tughalwala and with personal funds that he had collected, the Khalsa School's building was constructed. After Baba Aaya Singh ji's death in the year 1968, a new committee was elected. The names of the members are; S. Sampuran Singh Riar, Com. S. Chanan Singh Tughalwala, S. Sudagar Singh and S. Surjan Singh Riar. This committee also included Com. Uttam S. Rampura, Sant Tara Singh Wadala Granthian, Com. Gurcharan Singh Ladhupur and Bhai Puran Singh Bhathian. All committee members were veterans of the Indian Independence Movement. To bring Baba Aaya Singh ji's dream to reality this committee selected Com. S. Chanan Singh Tughalwala to lead the committee. Com. S. Chanan Singh was the president of all the three institutions until he died. The college was started with the intention of creating a college for free education for women. Till, S. Com. S. Chanan Singh ji was alive it remained a free education college. The paucity of funds was overcome by Com. Chanan Singh ji's efforts where he reached out, made use of his influence and presented the college structure to the administration and arranged to get the donations. Under his leadership, untiring efforts, commitment, drive, dedication this college became the "Shanti Niketan" of Punjab. The college was stated on Women's day in the year 1976, the first batch of students were 14 girls.  At present this college has 800 girl students.

Leadership and students
The college and other two institutions are where they are today because of the guidance and leadership of Com. S. Chanan Singh who was not only the president of these three institutions but also was the Vice Chairman of SGL Charitable Hospital, Jalandhar, Secretary of All India Freedom Fighter's Association, Chairman S.D. College Chandigarh, Secretary of Ram Singh Dutt Memorial Hall Gurdaspur.

Com. S. Chanan Singh, appointed Swaran Singh Virk as principal of this new institute, who was a teacher originally and later his wife was appointed the warden of the college hostel, when the girl's hostel was started. No wonder the college became an exemplary college under the guidance and supervision of the committee and under the leadership and Presidency of Com. S. Chanan Singh Tughalwala. Principal Sawaran Singh was given the power to perform his duties by the committee and needed guidance and help to perform his duties with liberty.

In 1999, there were total 4500 students, 496 of which are in hostel. The teachers volunteer to educate the students. Seniors teach juniors.

References 

 https://web.archive.org/web/20160304032429/http://www.sikh-history.com/sikhhist/institutes/school_at_tagewala.html

External links 

 http://www.ndtv.com/ndtv-at25/classics/special-report/304534

Universities and colleges in Punjab, India
Gurdaspur district
Educational institutions established in 1976
1976 establishments in Punjab, India